The following is a list of characters that first appeared in the British soap opera Emmerdale in 1997, by order of first appearance.

Lyn Hutchinson

Lyn Hutchinson, played by Sally Walsh, made her first appearance on 8 January 1997. Walsh said receiving the role of Lyn was "like coming home in a way" because she had previously worked with Steve Halliwell (Zak Dingle) and Paul Fox (Will Cairns). Louise Oswald of The People dubbed Lyn and Kelly Windsor (Adele Silva) Emmerdale's "terrible twosome" and compared them to Coronation Street's Battersby sisters. Oswald also stated, "Kelly and Lyn are the original sweet-faced kids with a frightening wild streak. Parents watching the show see what they get up to and start wondering what their own daughters are doing. And young soap fans love to see them up to the sort of tricks they wouldn't dare try themselves." Walsh's younger sister Amy Walsh joined the cast of Emmerdale in 2014 as Tracy Shankley.

Lyn taunts Kelly Windsor about her relationship with teacher, Tom Bainbridge (Jeremy Turner-Welch), causing the two girls to fight and forcing Tom to separate them. Despite this, Lyn and Kelly later become friends. Lyn bullies Emma Cairns (Rebecca Loudonsack) about her teenage pregnancy. She dates Roy Glover (Nicky Evans) and Marlon Dingle (Mark Charnock), who she then cheats on with Scott Windsor (Ben Freeman). Lyn breaks up with Marlon on his 25th birthday. Lyn and Scott start a relationship, which ends when she discovers Scott has been having an affair with Kelly, who is his stepsister. Disgusted by this, Lyn ends her relationship with Scott and leaves the village.

Barry Clegg

Barry Clegg, played by Bernard Wrigley, made his first appearance on 30 January 1997. Barry was introduced as the estranged husband of Lisa Clegg (Jane Cox). Despite the couple being separated, Barry lived in an outhouse on the same farm as Lisa. He was "an irritation" to Zak Dingle (Steve Halliwell), who was in love with Lisa.

Barry is an eccentric, who builds a space rocket. Marlon (Mark Charnock) and Butch Dingle (Paul Loughran) accidentally cause it to launch early while fighting, and it enters the Dingle's barn and explodes. Barry tries to stop Lisa from marrying Albert Dingle (Bobby Knutt), but is forcibly ejected from the church, leading to Albert's brother Zak to declare his feelings for Lisa. Months later, Barry competes against Zak for a busking pitch and he shows off his pedal powered microwave on a television show filmed in the village. Barry returns with a wedding present for Zak and Lisa's wedding. Although, they tell him he cannot come to the service, he attends Zak's stag night and lends him some money for the alcohol for the reception.

John Millar of the Daily Record branded Barry's space travel ambitions as "a laugh."

Paddy Kirk

Dee Pollard

Dee Pollard (née de La Cruz) was the former wife of Eric Pollard  and she appeared from February 1997 until April 1998.

Eric Pollard flew to the Far East looking for love and found it with Filipino student Dee de la Cruz in a Manila restaurant. His initial interest was sex, but two weeks later he proposed and the couple made plans for Dee to follow Eric back to Britain. When she arrived in 1997, dressed in a miniskirt and skimpy coat, and wearing high-heels, the locals in Emmerdale were curious. They were shocked when she announced that she was Eric's fiancée. But the unlikely relationship continued and Dee became Mrs Pollard in a May registry-office wedding. Dee left Emmerdale in April 1998 after discovering that her mother had died and Eric had kept this hidden from her. Dee returned home to the Philippines. Her marriage with Eric was annulled in 2001.

Will Cairns

William "Will" Cairns arrived in Emmerdale in February 1997 with his family as the second child and only son of Tony and Becky Cairns. One of his main storylines was when he was kidnapped by, Fiona Mallender, the daughter of a soldier his father had served with who wanted to avenge her father's death on a training exercise, which she blamed Tony for. Will left the village in January 1999, joining the rest of his family in Germany after his father was injured in a climbing accident.

Emma Cairns

Emma Cairns arrived in Emmerdale in February 1997 with her family as the youngest child and daughter of Tony and Becky Cairns, heavily pregnant. She gave birth to her daughter Geri a month later. Her father Tony wanted her to have Geri adopted and Emma initially agreed. However, she changed her mind when she bonded with her baby daughter but this didn't last. Gradually, Becky found herself looking after Geri more and more and so Geri was put up for adoption after all.

The father was later revealed to be Greg Cox, the ex-boyfriend of her sister Charlie. This led to Charlie leaving, only a few months after arriving. Her parents left for Germany in April 1998, with Emma joining them in the Summer.

Tony Cairns

Anthony "Tony" Cairns arrived in Emmerdale in March 1997 following the rest of his family after retiring early from the army. When his youngest daughter Emma gave birth to a baby girl who she named Geri at the young age of 13, Tony wanted her to have Geri adopted, to which Emma initially went along with. However, she defied her father and changed her mind when she grew close to her baby daughter. Tony left with Becky for Germany in April 1998 after he is offered a new job.

Becky Cairns

Rebecca "Becky" Cairns arrived in Emmerdale, where she grew up when she was young, in February 1997 with her family. Becky had a lesbian fling with vet Zoe Tate. After her affair with Zoe was exposed, Becky left with her husband Tony for Germany in April 1998 in an attempt to patch up her marriage.

Charlie Cairns

Charlie Cairns arrived in Emmerdale in February 1997 with her family. She is the eldest of Tony and Becky Cairns' three children. When her younger sister Emma gave birth to a baby a month later, she was devastated to learn her boyfriend, Greg Cox, was the father and this led to her departure in July.

Jo Steadman

Jo Steadman was a biker and short-term girlfriend of Alan Turner. Jo wanted Alan to sell The Woolpack and travel with her to America. Alan told her that he had built his life in Emmerdale. He told Jo to live her dream and that he would wait for her. Jo never returned.

Billy Hopwood

Lord Alex Oakwell

Tara Thornfield

Doug Hamilton

Doug Hamilton, played by Jay Benedict, made his first appearance on 2 October 1997. Doug is a businessman, who puts in an offer for the golf course, while "wining and dining" Kathy Glover (Malandra Burrows). Kathy later learns Doug is married and their relationship ends.

References

1997
, Emmerdale